Mister John is a 2013 drama film by Joe Lawlor and Christine Molloy (who are also known by the name of their creative partnership - Desperate Optimists). It was their second feature film following their debut Helen and stars Aidan Gillen, Zoe Tay, Michael Thomas, and Claire Keelan.

Plot
Gerry Devine leaves London to deal with his deceased brother's business and family in Singapore. He becomes increasingly adrift in trying to cope with the loss of his brother and with his troubled marriage back home.

Cast
 Aidan Gillen as Gerry Devine
 Zoe Tay as Kim Devine, John's widow
 Michael Thomas as Lester
 Claire Keelan as Kathleen Devine
 Vincent Tee as David Lim
 Michael Walsh, Andrew Bennett as John Devine, John Devine (Voice)
 Janice Koh as Lek
 Shu An Oon as Janjira
 Molly Rose Lawlor as Sarah Devine
 Ashleigh Judith White as Isadora Devine

Release
Mister John premiered at the Edinburgh International Film Festival.

Reception
Rotten Tomatoes, a review aggregator, reports that 85% of 13 surveyed critics gave the film a positive review; the average rating is 7.17/10. Tim Robey of The Daily Telegraph rated it 4/5 stars and described Gillen's acting as a "major, moving performance" that stops the film from becoming pretentious. Matt Micucci of Film Ireland compared it to Vertigo and called it "an incredibly brave and ambitious film for today's cinematic landscape". Guy Lodge of Variety described it as "a coolly composed, quietly impressive character study anchored by Aidan Gillen's tremendous performance". Stephen Dalton of The Hollywood Reporter wrote, "But despite some quality ingredients, Mister John never quite plumbs the hidden depths of poetic profundity it seems to promise."

References

External links
 

2013 films
Films set in Singapore
2013 drama films